List of presidents of the Senate of Mauritania until it was abolished in 2017.

Below is a list of office-holders:

Sources 

Mauritania politics-related lists
Mauritania, Senate